Tonawanda City School District is a public school district that serves the City of Tonawanda, New York.  The school district consists of 1,850 students in grades PreK-12 (three elementary schools, one 6-8 middle school, and one 9-12 high school.).  The district superintendent is Timothy A. Oldenburg, Ed.D.

Schools

Elementary
Mullen Elementary School (PreK-3)
Riverview Elementary School (K-3)
Fletcher Elementary School (4-5)

Middle (6-8) 
Tonawanda Middle School

High (9-12) 
Tonawanda High School

Former Schools
Delaware Elementary School
Highland Elementary School
Kibler Junior-Senior High School
Millstream Elementary School
Niagara Elementary School

Bird's Eye Images
Riverview Elementary School
Mullen Elementary School
Fletcher Elementary School
Tonawanda Middle-High School

External links

School districts in New York (state)
Education in Erie County, New York